Fokkeria is a genus of shield-backed bugs in the family Scutelleridae. There is one described species in Fokkeria, F. producta.

References

Further reading

 
 
 

Scutelleridae
Articles created by Qbugbot